Peck NW2 is a  peak in British Columbia, Canada, with a prominence of .
It is part of the Tower of London Range of the Muskwa Ranges in the Canadian Rockies.

References
Citations

Sources

Two-thousanders of British Columbia
Canadian Rockies
Peace River Land District